VDJ may refer to:
 VJ (media personality), a television announcer who introduces and plays videos
 V(D)J recombination, a mechanism of genetic recombination